The Lakeview School District is a small, rural public school district serving parts of Mercer County, Pennsylvania. The District encompasses multiple rural communities, including Fairview Township, New Vernon Township, New Lebanon, Mill Creek Township, Stoneboro, Lake Township, Sandy Lake, Sandy Lake Township, Jackson Township, Jackson Center, and Worth Township. According to 2000 federal census data, Lakeview School District served a district population of 8,462. By 2010, the District's population increased to 8,604 people. In 2009, Lakeview School District residents' per capita income was $16,811, while the median family income was $40,063. The District is one of the 500 public school districts of Pennsylvania.

Lakeview School District operates Oakview Elementary School, Lakeview Middle School, and Lakeview High School. The District provides a full-day kindergarten and preschool.

Extracurriculars
Lakeview School District offers a variety of clubs, activities and sports programs for middle school and high school students. The high school is a District 10 member of the Pennsylvania Interscholastic Athletic Association (PIAA).

Sports
The District funds:

Boys
Baseball - AA
Basketball- AA
Cross Country - A
Football - A (coop)
Golf - AA
Soccer - A
Track and Field - AA
Wrestling - AA

Girls
Basketball - AAA
Cheer - AAAAAA
Cross Country - A
Softball - AA
Track and Field - AA
Volleyball - AA

Junior High School Sports

Boys
Basketball
Cross Country
Football
Track and Field
Wrestling 

Girls
Basketball
Cross Country
Track and Field
Volleyball

According to PIAA directory January 2018

References

School districts in Mercer County, Pennsylvania